The pulpit in the pieve of Sant'Andrea, Pistoia, Italy is a masterpiece by the Italian sculptor Giovanni Pisano.
The work is often compared to the pulpits sculpted by Giovanni's father Nicola Pisano in the Baptistery of Pisa and the Duomo of Siena, which Giovanni had assisted with.  These very advanced works are often described in terms such as "proto-Renaissance", and draw on Ancient Roman sarcophagi and other influences to form a style that represents an early revival of classical sculpture, while also remaining Gothic, and drawing on sources such as French ivory carvings.

History
According to an inscription running between the pulpit's arcades and parapets, it was commissioned by Canon Arnoldus (Arnoldo) and supervised by the treasurers Andrea Vitelli and Tino di Vitale.  Vasari says the commission was given in 1297, and the inscription records its completion in 1301.  There is no false modesty: "
Giovanni carved it, who performed no empty work. The son of Nicola, and blessed with higher skill, Pisa gave him birth, endowed with mastery greater than any seen before".

Giovanni was approaching the age of fifty when he began the work, and had worked on his father's projects, and possibly visited France.

Description

The structure is similar to the pulpit in Pisa: a hexagonal plan with seven columns (one in the middle), two of which are supported by lions and one by a stooping figure of Atlas, while the central one rests on three winged gryphons and the remaining ones on plain bases. The organization of the parapet's reliefs is inspired by the pulpit in Siena.

The iconographic program is also inspired by Nicola's work, with "Allegories" in the pendentives of the arches, "Sibyls" and "Prophets standing on the capitals' tops, and the five parapets with the following scenes from the Life of Christ:
"Annunciation", "Nativity" with the apocryphal detail of the midwives bathing the baby Christ and an "Annunciation to the Shepherds"
"Dream of the Magi"
"Massacre of the Innocents"
"The Crucifixion"
"Last Judgement"

The sixth parapet is missing, as its side provides access to the pulpit; the original stairway has now been removed.

Style
The scenes are as crowded and dramatic as those of the Sienese pulpit. Most notable is the scene of the "Massacre of the Innocents", for which it has been supposed that Giovanni took inspiration from German models, or even from the Trajan column in Rome. One of the Sibyls, portrayed in the sudden gesture of fleeing towards an angel, is also of particular distinction.  For the first time Pisano tilted the reliefs, with the upper parts projecting further than the lower, to allow for the position of the viewer below.

Notes

References

 Henderson, George. Gothic, 1967, Penguin, 
 Olson, Roberta J.M., Italian Renaissance Sculpture, 1992, Thames & Hudson (World of Art), 
 Pope-Hennessy, John, Italian Gothic Sculpture, Phaidon, 1986, 
 White, John. Art and Architecture in Italy, 1250 to 1400, London, Penguin Books, 1966, 2nd edn 1987 (now Yale History of Art series). 

1301 works
Buildings and structures in Pistoia
Gothic sculptures
Tourist attractions in Tuscany
Monuments and memorials in Tuscany
Pulpits